Stâna may refer to:

 Stâna, a village in Socond Commune, Satu Mare County
 Stana, a village in Almașu Commune, Sălaj County
 Stâna, a village in the city of Zalău, Sălaj County

See also 
 Stana (disambiguation)
 Stâna River (disambiguation)
 Valea Stânei (disambiguation)
 Stânca (disambiguation)
 Stan (disambiguation)
 Stanca (disambiguation)